Joseph Gerard Polchinski Jr. (May 16, 1954 – February 2, 2018) was an American theoretical physicist and string theorist.

Biography
Polchinski was born in White Plains, New York, the elder of two children to Joseph Gerard Polchinski Sr. (1929–2002), a financial consultant and manager, and Joan (née Thornton), an office worker and homemaker. Polchinski was primarily of Irish descent with his paternal grandfather being Polish.

Polchinski graduated from Canyon del Oro High School in Tucson, Arizona, in 1971, obtained his B.S. degree from Caltech in 1975, and his Ph.D. from the University of California, Berkeley in 1980 under the supervision of Stanley Mandelstam. He did not publish any papers as a graduate student.
After postdoctoral positions at SLAC (1980–82) and Harvard (1982–84) he was a professor at the University of Texas at Austin from 1984 to 1992. From 1992 to March 2017 he was a professor in the Physics Department at the University of California, Santa Barbara and a permanent member of the Kavli Institute for Theoretical Physics there.

Contributions

Polchinski wrote the two-volume textbook String Theory, published in 1998. Among his many contributions to theoretical physics, D-branes are the best known. In 2008 he won the Dirac Medal for his work in superstring theory.  He was awarded the 2017 Fundamental Physics Prize in recognition of his contributions to theoretical physics.

D-branes
Polchinski's contributions to D-brane physics were a primary trigger of the 2nd superstring revolution and the physics of holographic gauge-gravity dualities. After co-discovering D-branes in 1989, his 1995 work conjectured and partially demonstrated the equivalence between D-branes and black p-branes. The duality between these objects was soon understood to be a demonstration of holography, in which a theory of quantum gravity (the black p-branes) is equivalent to a lower-dimensional theory without gravity (the D-branes), as later demonstrated in Maldacena's AdS-CFT duality.

Polchinski's paradox
In an unpublished communication to Kip Thorne circa 1990, commenting on the Novikov self-consistency principle (in relation to sending objects or people through a traversable wormhole into the past, and the time paradoxes that could result), Polchinski raised a potentially paradoxical situation involving a billiard ball sent through a wormhole which sends it back in time. In this scenario, the ball is fired into a wormhole at an angle such that, if it continues along that path, it will exit the wormhole in the past at just the right angle to collide with its earlier self, thereby knocking it off course and preventing it from entering the wormhole in the first place. Thorne dubbed this problem "Polchinski's paradox" in 1994.  Later students of the whimsical problem came up with solutions which managed to avoid any inconsistencies, by having the ball emerge from the future at a different angle than the one used to generate the paradox, and deliver its younger self a glancing blow instead of knocking it completely away from the wormhole, a blow which changes its trajectory in just the right way so that it will travel back in time with the angle required to deliver its younger self this glancing blow.

2012 paper on black holes

In July 2012, Polchinski, with two of his students, James Sully and Ahmed Almheiri, and fellow string theorist Donald Marolf at the University of California, Santa Barbara (UCSB), published a paper whose calculations about black hole radiation suggested that either general relativity's equivalence principle is wrong, or else a key tenet of quantum mechanics is incorrect.

Personal life and death
Polchinski had two sons, Steven and Daniel, with his wife, Dorothy Maria Chun, whom he married in 1980.

He died at his home in Santa Barbara, California on February 2, 2018, of brain cancer, at the age of 63.

Bibliography

.  Autobiographical memoir.

References

External links

Personal website

1954 births
2018 deaths
American people of Polish descent
California Institute of Technology alumni
Harvard University staff
People from White Plains, New York
American string theorists
Members of the United States National Academy of Sciences
University of California, Berkeley alumni
University of Texas at Austin faculty
University of California, Santa Barbara faculty
Deaths from brain tumor
Scientists from New York (state)